San Emidio Geothermal Plant, in Washoe County, Nevada, is a geothermal power plant with a design capacity of . The upgraded plant went online on May 25, 2012.

History
The plant is the second to occupy the site.  The older  plant, originally known as the Empire Geothermal Plant, which was sold by Empire Geothermal Power LLC to U.S. Geothermal Inc. in 2008, was commissioned in 1987. Phase I of the reconstruction added an  generator.

In January, 2020, the BLM initiated an environmental assessment concerning a possible new  power plant, substation, as many as 25 geothermal and injection wells, a 7.5 mile above ground pipeline and a 58 mile long power line terminating in Fernley, NV.  The powerline will parallel an existing 500kV line and use existing access roads.

Future expansions
Phase II (Initially planned for 3Q 2013) (2020)
Phase III with

Notes

Energy infrastructure completed in 2012
Buildings and structures in Washoe County, Nevada
Geothermal power stations in Nevada